Crataegus stolonifera is a hawthorn species native to the northeastern U.S. and southeastern Canada.

References

stolonifera
Flora of North America